The Gift is the sixth and final serial of the third series of the British science fiction television series The Sarah Jane Adventures. It first aired in two parts on CBBC on 19 and 20 November 2009.

The story features Tree and Leef Slitheen-Blathereen, descendants of an offshoot branch of the Slitheen family of Raxacoricofallapatorius that the protagonist Sarah Jane Smith has faced several times before in the series. They gift Sarah Jane and the Earth a Raxacoricofallapatorian plant that spreads spores to both quickly grow and wipe out humanity for profit.

Plot
Tree and Leef Slitheen-Blathereen, who are descendants of an inter-clan marriage of the Slitheen and Blathereen families of Raxacoricofallapatorius many generations ago, stop the plans of two other Slitheen that try to compress the Earth and teleport them away to be executed. Claiming to be law-abiding bounty hunters, Tree and Leef offer a plant called Rakweed as a gift over dinner with Sarah Jane, Luke, Clyde, and Rani. They supposedly did this out of altruistic reasons to help feed the Earth, but are actually helping the addictive weed to spread and overwhelm London, and eventually Earth, with spores that will cause humanity to fall into a coma they will never wake up from. Tree and Leef intend to profit greatly from turning Earth into a Rakweed farm.

The next day, Luke stays at home after inhaling the spores, while Clyde and Rani go to school; Clyde surreptitiously takes K9 with him, intending to cheat on his biology exam. As the test begins, a Rakweed plant has quickly grown in a pot and causes a teacher to fall ill. Just before another Rakweed plant unleashes its spores on Rani and Clyde, the school bell starts ringing, destroying the Rakweed. They then realise that the Rakweed's weakness is noise of a certain frequency, which interferes with its communication signals and prevents it from growing, thus killing it instantly. Mr Smith activates all sound-producing devices in London at the same frequency as the school bell after K9 transmits the frequency for the school bell to Mr Smith. Within seconds, all bells, alarms, radios and car alarms go off and ultimately all the Rakweed in London is destroyed before it is too late. Enraged at their plans being ruined, Tree and Leef teleport to Sarah Jane's attic and threaten to kill everyone. Mr Smith generates the same frequency, destroying the partially digested Rakweed in their stomachs. The resultant build-up of methane gas causes them to explode.

Continuity
Sarah Jane visited Antarctica once before with the Fourth Doctor serial The Seeds of Doom.
The Blathereen had previously featured in the Doctor Who novel, The Monsters Inside by Stephen Cole.
This is the first reference to the Raxacoricofallapatorian family known as the Racdeen.
Part 1 includes K9's second reference to his hover mode, the first being in The Wedding of Sarah Jane Smith, Part 1; he has never been actually seen hovering.
Sarah Jane uses a dog whistle to call K9; a trick used by the Fourth Doctor in the episode The Ribos Operation.
The use of plants as a weapon could be a reference to the deadly Varga plants in the episode "Mission to the Unknown".
Mr Smith hacking into millions of personal electronic devices and causing them to simultaneously emit a unified signal was done before, during his guest appearance in the Doctor Who episode, "Journey's End". The use of millions of personal electronic devices to transmit a simultaneous signal damaging to an alien aggressor is also reminiscent of Martha Jones' use of the Archangel Network against The Master in "Last of the Time Lords". After this episode, Sarah Jane and Luke briefly appeared in The Tenth Doctor's final story, "The End of Time".
Upon defeating the Blathereen, Sarah Jane says "There should have been a better way," as part of an atypically sombre scene where the characters are experiencing a pyrrhic victory. This is similar to the Fifth Doctor's final comment in the serial Warriors of the Deep, in which that story's enemies also suffered an unnecessary death and the death of the human race was narrowly averted; in the case of The Sarah Jane Adventures, the cause for despair is given a more comical twist for the programme's target audience. 
In Part 2, a news reporter mentions the "tropical disease" (Rakweed) had affected Perivale. Perivale is Ace's home neighbourhood. He also mentions that the Rakweed has affected Chiswick as well, the area where Donna Noble lived.

Broadcast and reception
"Part 1" was seen by 822,000 viewers, while "Part 2" was seen by 788,000.

Novelisation

Pearson Education published a simplified novelisation of this episode by Trevor Baxendale under the title Blathereen Dream for school literacy programs in September 2010.

References

External links

The Sarah Jane Adventures episodes
Slitheen television stories
2009 British television episodes
Television episodes set in schools